{{chembox
| Verifiedfields = changed
| Watchedfields = changed
| verifiedrevid = 400753856
| ImageFile = Iodophenpropit.svg
| ImageSize = 240
| IUPACName = 3-(1H-imidazol-5-yl)propyl N'''-[2-(4-iodophenyl)ethyl]imidothiocarbamate
| OtherNames = 1-[3-(3H-imidazol-4-yl)propylthio]-N-[2-(4-iodophenyl)ethyl]formamidine

| Section1 = 

| Section2 = 

| Section3 = 
}}Iodophenpropit''' is a histamine antagonist which binds selectively to the H3 subtype. Its 125I radiolabelled form has been used for mapping the distribution of H3 receptors in animal studies.

References

H3 receptor antagonists
Imidazoles
Iodoarenes